Edna Fischel Gellhorn (1878 – 1970) was an American suffragist and reformer who played a prominent role in founding the League of Women Voters.

Early life 
Edna Fischel Gellhorn was born on December 18, 1878 in St. Louis, Missouri. Her father taught clinical medicine as a professor at Washington University School of Medicine and helped co-found the Barnard Free Skin and Cancer Hospital. Her mother was Martha Ellis Fischel. Both parents were involved in the Ethical Culture Society of St. Louis. Influenced by her parents, Fischel was involved in the community and dedicated her time to civic work. She attended the Mary Institute and Bryn Mawr College. She served as student president at each school. Upon graduating from Bryn Mawr in 1900, Fischel was elected lifetime president of her class.

St. Louis/Missouri State Equal Suffrage Leagues & League of Women Voters 

Gellhorn was an officer in both the St. Louis and Missouri State Equal Suffrage Leagues from 1910 until the Nineteenth Amendment was passed in 1919. 

At the 1916 national Democratic convention held in St. Louis, "The Golden Lane," represented thousands of women carrying yellow parasols and wearing yellow sashes, lined both sides of the road leading to the Coliseum. A tableau of the states was in front of the Art Museum that read "states with no votes for women," and was draped in black cloth. In the front row were two little girls, Mary Taussig and Martha Gellhorn (Gellhorn's daughter), representing future voters.

In 1920, Gellhorn became one of the founders, and vice president, of the National League of Women Voters. Gellhorn was asked to be the president of the National League by Carrie Chapman Catt, but declined. Gellhorn also was on the National League's board, was president of the St. Louis League for three terms, and was the first president of the Missouri League of Women Voters. She was elected to the League's state and national Rolls of Honor.

Other reform efforts 
Gellhorn co-founded and worked for the United Nations Association, the National Municipal League, and the American Association of University Women, and she was regional director of the food rationing programs during World War I. Gellhorn support racial equality. In 1919, she made the deciding vote in a vote held by the St. Louis League of Women Voters that would allow African-American women to serve on the board. Just two years later, Gellhorn, along with the rest of the League, left the Advisory Board, a collective of St. Louis women's organizations, because the organization would not allow African-American women.

Death and legacy 
In 1968, Washington University in St. Louis created the Edna Fischel Gellhorn Professorship of Public Affairs. At age 79, Gellhorn was selected as Woman of Achievement by the St. Louis Globe-Democrat. She died in St. Louis in 1970.

Her papers are held in the collection of Washington University in St. Louis.

Edna Fischel Gellhorn's daughter, Martha Gellhorn, was a war reporter.[2]

References

External link

American suffragists
1878 births
1970 deaths
People from St. Louis
American people of German-Jewish descent
Bryn Mawr College alumni